Enfida Sports (النفيضة الرياضية) is a Tunisian football club located in Enfidha. It is currently evolving in the 2014–15 Tunisian Ligue Professionnelle 2.

References

Football clubs in Tunisia